Kenia Arias, known mononymously as Kenia, is a Puerto Rican and Dominican recording artist, lyricist, film, stage, and television actress. Since 2000, she has independently released two mixtapes, one EP and three albums. She has collaborated with various independent rap artists throughout her career. Kenia has appeared in television shows, such as USA's Graceland and Netflix's Glow.

Biography

Early life and influences
Arias were born to Jaime Arias and Mercedes E. Hernandez. Arias were raised with her older brother Jimmy Arias in Medford, Long Island, New York. Arias has three half siblings, one of which is deceased, from her father's previous marriage. Her ethnicity is Puerto Rican and Dominican.

Arias first showed interest in performing at the age of four, and at the age of six decided she wanted to become a professional singer and actor. Arias were 12 when she and a neighbor formed an all-girl group entitled "The Lazers". The group recruited a third member and would perform covers of Salt n' Pepper songs for their neighbors on the block. Arias has been quoted as saying "I just felt an urgency to entertain; I wanted to put on a good show for people and make them feel happy". It was at this time Arias started her lifelong journey of taking vocal lessons. Arias was, 14 when she first performed professionally at a resort in Puerto Rico and shot her first commercial. This same year, she started recording covers at a local studio on Long Island. Her first recording was Whitney Houston's "I Will Always Love You".  At the age of 16 Arias began writing her own material and recording at several recording studios in Manhattan, New York. Arias grew up listening to Madonna, Mariah Carey, Wu-Tang Clan, Nas, Celia Cruz, Fania All-Stars, Groupo Mania, Janet Jackson, Selena y Los Dinos, Little Kim, Juan Luis Guerra, Alanis Morissette and many more; which have all, to some degree, inspired Arias' music. During this time, Arias signed a production deal and released her first self-titled album.

While attending Patchogue-Medford High School, Arias was involved in New York State beauty pageants and was awarded the titles of "Miss Teen Long Island" and" Miss Teen Talent New York State" along with many sub-categories such as "Miss Congeniality". She was featured in many local papers pertaining to her pageant career. Arias also performed on Showtime at the Apollo, Puerto Rican Day Parade and Club New York; all before the age of 17. She earned her bachelor's degree from Florida International University in Miami, FL.

Career

1996–2009

Arias had her first entertainment job at the age of 14 when she was cast a dancer in a national dance television show; she remained on the show for two years. Arias convinced her parents she needed a talent agent and within one week Arias was signed with two talent agencies. Arias began modeling for print and trade shows. After several years as a teen model, Arias decided to end her modeling career to exclusively focus on her music. Arias recorded her first self-titled studio album in Manhattan, New York. She was involved in the production as vocalist; songwriter, had a minor role as the producer on the album. Arias relocated with her family to Florida in 2001, where she attended Indian River State College. There she was cast in her first theater production. Arias had never taken acting classes and was not involved in the theater program while attending. However, she decided to audition for a play the department was casting and landed a supporting role. During this time, she auditioned for a musical at her local community theater and was cast in a supporting role. Arias sang at several community festivals in Port Saint Lucie, Florida and Stuart, Florida. Arias also attended Florida International University where her artistic career was featured in the University's newspaper.

2009–present

Arias continued submitting demos to several agencies and was eventually signed to a distribution deal. Arias recorded eight songs and is credited as vocalist, lyricist and producer on her album entitled "Karma'. The album was consisted of pop-rock, hip hop and Latin genres. During this time, Arias produced a self-funded national tour for the album. Mid-production, the tour was cancelled due to Arias' father suffering a stroke. Arias decided it was best to pause production until further notice; the tour never developed past its pre-production stage. During this time Arias decided to part ways with her publisher and began to self-distribute her own material. It wasn't until three years later that Arias decided to record new material; she recorded an EP entitled "Unconscious" and partnered with Spinnup/Universal Music for the release. The EP reflected the journey she was on during the stroke and cancer diagnosis of her father. She was also featured in two issues of the Stuart Magazine, which was distributed through Barnes and Noble retailers.

Personal life
Kenia currently resides in Los Angeles, CA with her husband, actor Alexander Stein, whom she met at Indian River State College. Stein is credited as a producer on several of Arias' productions since 2003. The couple was married in February 2015.

Discography

Studio albums
 Karma (2010)
 Unconscious (2013)

Singles
 "Animal Instinct" (2012)

Tours
Karma (2010/Cancelled)

Filmography

Film

Television

Notes

References

External links

 
 
 

Living people
People from San Juan, Puerto Rico
American feminists
People from Medford, New York
Singer-songwriters from New York (state)
Puerto Rican singer-songwriters
Spanish-language singers of the United States
American musicians of Puerto Rican descent
Feminist musicians
American women singer-songwriters
Year of birth missing (living people)